The 2020 Porsche Carrera Cup Great Britain was a multi-event, one-make motor racing championship held across England and Scotland. The championship featured a mix of professional motor racing teams and privately funded drivers, competing in Porsche 991 GT3 Cup cars that conformed to the technical regulations for the championship. It formed part of the extensive program of support categories built up around the BTCC centrepiece. The 2020 season was the 18th Porsche Carrera Cup Great Britain season, commencing on 28 March at Donington Park – on the circuit's Indy configuration – and finishing on 11 October at Brands Hatch, utilising the Grand Prix circuit, after sixteen races at eight meetings. All sixteen of the races will be held in support of the 2020 British Touring Car Championship.

Harry King was the Pro champion with Team Parker Racing, Esmee Hawkey claimed the Pro-Am title also with Team Parker Racing and Justin Sherwood made it a triple Team Parker win by dominating the Am class.

Teams and Drivers

The following teams and drivers are currently signed to run the 2020 season.

Race Calendar
A new calendar was announced on 26 May 2020.

Championship standings

Drivers' championships

* Guest entry - not eligible for points

References

External links
 

Porsche Carrera Cup
Porsche Carrera Cup Great Britain seasons